A Ghost at Noon may refer to:
Contempt: by Alberto Moravia
Contempt (film): based on the book